Sasikumar or Sasi Kumar may refer to:

 B. Sasikumar (born 1949), Carnatic violinist, teacher, and composer from Kerala
 G. Sasikumar, Tamil film editor
 J. Sasikumar (1927–2014), Malayalam film director
 M. Sasikumar (born 1974), Tamil film director, actor and producer
 R. Sasikumar, a Singaporean former footballer and sports marketing executive
 Sasikumar (actor, born 1944), Tamil film and theatre actor
 Sashi Kumar (K. Sasikumar), media personality from Kerala and founder of Asianet TV
 Sashikumar Subramani, Tamil film actor
 Shashi Kumar (born 1965), Kannada film actor
 Vinayak Sasikumar (born 1994), Indian lyricist, best known for his works in Malayalam cinema
 V. Sasikumar (born 1961), Politician from Kerala. Former MLA of Perinthalmanna.